Eduardo Gurbindo Martínez  (born 8 November 1987) is a Spanish handball player who plays for CS Dinamo București and the Spain national team.

He participated at the 2019 World Men's Handball Championship.

References

External links

BM Valladolid profile

1987 births
Living people
Sportspeople from Pamplona
Spanish male handball players
Liga ASOBAL players
SDC San Antonio players
CB Torrevieja players
BM Valladolid players
FC Barcelona Handbol players
CS Dinamo București (men's handball) players
Handball players at the 2012 Summer Olympics
Olympic handball players of Spain
Expatriate handball players
Spanish expatriate sportspeople in France
Spanish expatriate sportspeople in Romania
Handball players from Navarre
Handball players at the 2020 Summer Olympics
Medalists at the 2020 Summer Olympics
Olympic bronze medalists for Spain
Olympic medalists in handball